Scythris indigoferivora is a moth of the family Scythrididae. It was described by Bengt Å. Bengtsson in 2002. It is found in Sudan and Yemen.

The larvae feed on Acacia seyal and Indigofera oblongifolia.

References

indigoferivora
Moths described in 2002